The 2008 Portsmouth Invitational Tournament was a United States basketball tournament played in Portsmouth, Virginia from April 9 through April 12, 2008.

Bracket

Consolation Bracket

Rosters

* - Asterisk denotes Most Valuable Player
** - Double Asterisks denotes All Tournament Team

External links
Portsmouth Invitational

2008 in basketball